Bembidion nigrum is a species of ground beetle in the family Carabidae. It is found in North America.

Subspecies
These two subspecies belong to the species Bembidion nigrum:
 Bembidion nigrum facile Casey
 Bembidion nigrum nigrum

References

Further reading

External links

 

nigrum
Articles created by Qbugbot
Beetles described in 1823